The Europe Zone was one of the two regional zones of the 1925 International Lawn Tennis Challenge.

16 teams entered the Europe Zone, with the winner going on to compete in the Inter-Zonal Final against the winner of the America Zone. France defeated the Netherlands in the final, and went on to face Australia in the Inter-Zonal Final.

Draw

First round

Hungary vs. France

Portugal vs. Italy

Denmark vs. Romania

Poland vs. Great Britain

Austria vs. Ireland

Belgium vs. India

Switzerland vs. Sweden

Netherlands vs. Czechoslovakia

Quarterfinals

France vs. Italy

Denmark vs. Great Britain

Austria vs. India

Netherlands vs. Sweden

Semifinals

Great Britain vs. France

Netherlands vs. India

Final

Netherlands vs. France

References

External links
Davis Cup official website

Davis Cup Europe/Africa Zone
Europe Zone
International Lawn Tennis Challenge